Jorden rundt på to timer (Around the World in Two Hours) is a documentary film from 1949 directed by Rasmus Breistein. He traveled the world with the photographer Arild Nybakken and put the clips together into a full-length feature film. The film was edited by Rasmus Breistein and Olav Engebretsen.

This was the first full-length color film made in Norway. The film has a running time of 105 minutes.

References

External links
 
 Jorden rundt på to timer at the National Library of Norway
 Jorden rundt på to timer at Filmfront

1949 films
Films directed by Rasmus Breistein